Gravity biking is a sport involving riding specially adapted bicycles down steep hills at high speeds. It is popular in the United States and Colombia. It is risky, and has been banned in the town of La Ceja in Antioquia, Columbia after a series of deaths and serious injuries.

References 

Cycle sport